Nigh is a surname. Notable people with the surname include:

 George Nigh (born 1927), Governor of Oklahoma
 Jane Nigh (1925–1993), American actress
 Ronald Nigh (born 1947), American ecological anthropologist 
 William Nigh (1881–1955), American film director, writer, and actor
 Daniel Nigh (1997-), American serial child sexual abuser

See also
 Nye (disambiguation)